Różanystok  is a village and former monastery in northeastern Poland, known regionally for both its ornate 18th-century minor basilica and its agricultural magnet school.

Geography
Różanystok, formerly known as Krzywy Stok ("Crooked Slope"), is located in the township of Dąbrowa Białostocka, which is in turn situated in the Podlaskie region's Sokółka County division. From the years 1975-1998 the area was part of the Białystok Voivodeship (1975-1998) administrative district. The Belarusian city of Grodno can be seen from the Basilica's bell tower.

Part of the village's geographical boundary is defined by a stone wall that remains from its days as a monastery.

Różanystok is a stop on the northeastern Poland PKP train line, which also stops in Białystok, Sokółka, Augustów and Suwałki.

History

The village is home to a well-known Mary, Mother of God shrine, to which tens of thousands of pilgrims travel each year. The shrine's focus is a 17th-century image of Mary holding the infant Jesus which is believed to be miraculous. A "coronation" celebration for the Różanystok icon was held on June 28, 1981, and the church was named a minor basilica on August 30, 1987.

Since 1954, Różanystok has also been the location of a state-run Zespól Szkól Rolniczych (Group Agricultural School). The school's five-year technical program prepares students for work in agriculture and related fields, while its four-year economics program prepares students for work in business and/or advanced studies at the university level.

The church complex was used as a military storage depot during World War I, and several of its buildings were destroyed in World War II.

Demographics

Most of Różanystok's 510 residents, who primarily live in two three-story apartment buildings within the village, attend, work at, or are retired from employment at the school.

Images

External links
 Official church homepage
 Polish Wikipedia entry - includes geographical coordinates and link to Google map
 Official pilgrimage website (Polish)
 Rozanystok photos on TrekEarth

Villages in Sokółka County
Basilica churches in Poland
History of Catholicism in Poland